Sheats is a surname. Notable people with the surname include:
Charles Christopher Sheats (1839–1904), American lawyer and politician
 David Sheats,  American hip-hop producer and DJ
Robert Sheats (1915–1995), United States Navy master diver
William N. Sheats (1851–1922), educator and politician